Ladislav Kohn (born March 4, 1975) is a Czech former professional ice hockey Forward who played in the National Hockey League (NHL) with the Calgary Flames, Toronto Maple Leafs, Mighty Ducks of Anaheim, Atlanta Thrashers and the Detroit Red Wings.

Playing career
He was drafted by the Calgary Flames in the seventh round, 175th overall, of the 1994 NHL Entry Draft.  He played in Finland's SM-liiga with the Espoo Blues from 2003 to 2007 before moving to Russia with HC CSKA Moscow.  He now plays in the Kontinental Hockey League for HC Neftekhimik Nizhnekamsk.

After playing briefly with HC Kladno in the Czechoslovak Extraliga in the 1992–93 season, Kohn joined the Western Hockey League in 1993–94.  After two seasons of junior hockey, Kohn made his professional debut with Calgary's AHL affiliate, the Saint John Flames.

Kohn played five NHL games with Calgary in the 1995–96 season, and four more in the 1997–98 season.  Before the 1998–99 season, the Flames traded him to the Toronto Maple Leafs in exchange for David Cooper.

Kohn would become an NHL journeyman, playing for Calgary, Toronto, the Mighty Ducks of Anaheim, the Atlanta Thrashers, the Detroit Red Wings, then the Flames again.  He returned to Europe in 2003–04, joining the Espoo Blues.  In 2001-02 he played only 4 games for Detroit.  He was called as a spare played by the Red Wings.  Detroit Red Wings included Kohn on team picture, and awarded him a Stanley Cup ring.  He even got to spend part of a day with the Stanley Cup.  However, Kohn did not qualify to have name included on the Stanley Cup (41 regular season games played, or 1 game played in the finals.)

In his NHL career, Kohn appeared in 186 regular-season games.  He scored 14 goals and added 28 assists.  He also appeared in two games with Toronto during the 1999 Stanley Cup Playoffs, going scoreless.

International play
Kohn played his first game for the national team in 2004, and has played 23 times for the Czech national team.

Career statistics

Regular season and playoffs

International

References

External links

1975 births
Atlanta Thrashers players
Brandon Wheat Kings players
Calgary Flames draft picks
Calgary Flames players
Cincinnati Mighty Ducks players
Czech expatriate ice hockey players in Canada
Czech ice hockey right wingers
Detroit Red Wings players
Espoo Blues players
Czech expatriate ice hockey players in Russia
HC CSKA Moscow players
Rytíři Kladno players
HC Neftekhimik Nizhnekamsk players
HC Oceláři Třinec players
Living people
Mighty Ducks of Anaheim players
People from Uherské Hradiště
Philadelphia Phantoms players
Saint John Flames players
St. John's Maple Leafs players
Swift Current Broncos players
Toronto Maple Leafs players
Jewish ice hockey players
Sportspeople from the Zlín Region
Czech expatriate ice hockey players in the United States
Czech expatriate ice hockey players in Finland
Czech expatriate ice hockey players in Switzerland